St. Casimir Parish Historic District is a national historic district located at South Bend, St. Joseph County, Indiana.  The district encompasses 321 contributing buildings in a predominantly residential section of South Bend centered on St. Casimir Roman Catholic Church. It developed between about 1880 and 1945, and includes notable examples of Queen Anne, Romanesque Revival, Renaissance Revival, and Bungalow / American Craftsman style architecture. Notable buildings include the St. Casimir Church (1924-1925).

It was listed on the National Register of Historic Places in 1997.

References

Historic districts on the National Register of Historic Places in Indiana
Queen Anne architecture in Indiana
Romanesque Revival architecture in Indiana
Renaissance Revival architecture in Indiana
Historic districts in South Bend, Indiana
National Register of Historic Places in St. Joseph County, Indiana